Dutch violinist Frederieke Saeijs (born in The Hague, Netherlands, on 25 January 1979) is the winner of the First Grand Prize as well as four special Prizes of the 2005 International Violin Competition Marguerite Long-Jacques Thibaud in Paris, France.

As a result, Frederieke Saeijs performed as a soloist with the Flanders Symphony, Hagen Philharmonic, Haifa Symphony, New Japan Philharmonic, Orchestre National de Montpellier, Orchestre National de France, Orchestre Philharmonique de Radio France, Residentie Orchestra, Rotterdam Philharmonic Orchestra, Royal Scottish National Orchestra and the St. Petersburg Philharmonic. She collaborated with conductors Jonathan Darlington, Antony Hermus, Neeme Järvi, Friedemann Layer, Ion Marin, Christoph Poppen, Noam Sheriff, Etienne Siebens, Vassily Sinaisky and Jaap van Zweden.

She was invited to play concerts in Austria, Belgium, France, Germany, Hong Kong, Israel, Italy, Romania, Japan, Russia, Scotland, Taiwan, Netherlands and the USA.

Frederieke Saeijs was Artist in Residence in the Dr.Anton Philipszaal/Nieuwe Kerk in The Hague, The Netherlands from 2006-2009. In the year 2009 she played the same role during the Dutch music summer and at the Festival of the Sound in Parry Sound, Canada.

Frederieke Saeijs is playing on a Pietro Guarneri violin (Venice, 1725), Ex-Reine Elisabeth, kindly lent to her by the Dutch National Music Instrument Foundation.

Since 2009 Ms Saeijs is a violin professor at the Royal Conservatory in The Hague, The Netherlands. She is also a violin professor at the Alfonso X El Sabio University  in Madrid, Spain.

In December 2009 record label Naxos released a cd with sonatas for violin and piano by Ravel, Respighi and Granados, performed by Saeijs and pianist Maurice Lammerts van Bueren.

References

International Violin Competition Marguerite Long-Jacques Thibaud
Dutch National Music Instrument Foundation
Royal Conservatory The Hague
Record label Naxos
Dr. Anton Philipszaal
Dutch Music Summer
Festival of the Sound

External links
Official website
Myspace page
Facebook page

1979 births
Living people
Dutch classical violinists
Musicians from The Hague
Long-Thibaud-Crespin Competition prize-winners
21st-century classical violinists
Women classical violinists
Academic staff of Alfonso X El Sabio University